The Spanish Cross in Gold with Swords and Diamonds was awarded to members of the Condor Legion in recognition of repeated acts above and beyond the call of duty during the Spanish Civil War.

Description and context
The Spanish Cross in Gold with Swords and Diamonds was instituted on 14 April 1939. It was awarded in recognition of repeated acts above and beyond the call of duty. It was awarded 28 times, mostly to members of the Luftwaffe, the air force of Nazi Germany.

The Condor Legion, upon establishment, was made up of Kampfgruppe 88 (K/88), with three squadrons of Junkers Ju 52 bombers and Jagdgruppe 88 (J/88) with three squadrons of Heinkel He 51 fighters. They were supported by the reconnaissance Aufklärungsgruppe 88 (A/88), its maritime division, the Aufklärungsgruppe See 88 (AS/88), an anti-aircraft artillery group, the Flakbteilung 88 (F/88), and a signals group, the Nachrichtenabteilung 88 (LN/88). Overall command was given to Hugo Sperrle, with Alexander Holle as chief of staff. Two armoured units under the command of Wilhelm Ritter von Thoma were also operational.

Recipients

References

Citations

Sources

Spanish Cross
 
Spanish Cross In Gold with Swords and Diamonds
Spanish Cross In Gold with Swords and Diamonds
+
Spanish Cross in Gold with Swords and Diamonds recipients
Spanish Cross in Gold with Swords and Diamonds